Aino Lillalida Bergö (commonly spelled Aino Bergo in English-language publications) (1915 – July 1944) was a Swedish ballerina, opera singer and film actress.

Life

Bergö studied ballet in Stockholm. She performed ballet in Berlin and Munich and starred in operettas in Vienna. Bergö starred in the 1936 German film Das Frauenparadies and later relocated to England, where producer Irving Asher helped her land a starring role in Thistledown. In 1938 in Chelsea, London Bergö married Richard Fairey, the eldest son of Sir Charles Richard Fairey, an aircraft manufacturer. They were divorced in 1943.

Bergö was killed in July 1944 in a German flying bomb attack in southern England. Her death was registered in Kensington, London. Her services were held at the Swedish Church on Harcourt Street in London.

Filmography 

 1938, Thistledown  (Note: the British Film Institute has listed this film as lost)
 1936, Das Frauenparadies

References

External links
 Aino Bergo Movie Cards
 

Swedish civilians killed in World War II
Swedish film actresses
Swedish stage actresses
Swedish ballerinas
1915 births
1944 deaths
20th-century Swedish actresses
20th-century Swedish women  opera singers
Deaths by airstrike during World War II